Asen Gavrilov (10 June 1926 – 21 May 2006) was a famous Bulgarian ballet dancer and choreographer.

He was renowned by his roles in Swan Lake, Giselle and The Dragon and Yana, and by his choreography of Aida and Prince Igor. He received the award of People's Artist by his contributions to Bulgarian culture.

Bulgarian choreographers
1926 births
2006 deaths
Bulgarian male ballet dancers